WTRO may refer to

 WTRO (AM), a radio station (1450 AM) licensed to Dyersburg, Tennessee, United States
 W.T.R.O., song by Paul Gilbert
 World Trade Organization